Bernd Peter Pischetsrieder (born 15 February 1948) is a German automobile engineer and manager.

Early life and education
Pischetsrieder was born in Munich, Bavaria, and studied Mechanical Engineering at the Technical University of Munich from 1968 to 1972. He earned the degree of Diplom-Ingenieur.

Career

BMW
Pischetsrieder began his career at BMW in 1973 as a production planning engineer. He was promoted to become chairman of the board of BMW from 1993 through 1999.

During his time as head of BMW, Pischetsrieder was known for solidifying the company's position as a leader in the luxury car market with a solid sporting and engineering reputation. His decision in 1994 to purchase Rover Group from British Aerospace was widely regarded as a failure on paper. Although many of the assets were sold at vast profit and the purchase brought the valuable Mini and Land Rover marques into BMW ownership, the Rover passenger car operation drained the company's coffers.  Rover was sold off in 2000, with Ford taking on Land Rover, and the Mini brand remaining at BMW.  A more lasting achievement was the assumption of the Rolls-Royce marque, a deal which left rival Volkswagen Group manager, Ferdinand Piëch, with only the Bentley marque, and the Crewe factory. However, this operation has turned out to be much more successful than the Rolls-Royce operation, and it is a matter of debate whether BMW would have been better off keeping Bentley  rather than having to take a licence for the Rolls-Royce name

Volkswagen Group
Late in 2000 Pischetsrieder joined Volkswagen Group, mandated initially to take responsibility for quality, as "the voice of the customer" across the group, along with specific responsibility for giving the group's SEAT operation a new focus. On 1 July 2000 he was appointed chief executive officer at SEAT and stayed to this position up to 6 March 2002. On 16 April 2002, Pischetsrieder succeeded Piëch as chairman of Volkswagen AG. At Volkswagen, he directed Bugatti Automobiles SAS to reengineer the Bugatti Veyron 16.4, delaying an expected launch. He continued moving the Audi and Volkswagen marques upmarket to some controversy.

During Pischetsrieder's time at the helm, the Volkswagen share price rose by 80 percent. By 2005, the company regained its position as western Europe's biggest car brand and passed Renault for the first time since 2001 in the region and recorded record global sales. In May 2006, Volkswagen announced that it would extend Pischetsrieder's contract for five years, despite and an earlier expression of no confidence by the company's chairman Ferdinand Piëch. In a surprise announcement on 7 November 2006, however, it was revealed that Pischetsrieder would be stepping down from the top job at Volkswagen AG on 31 December that year. He was to be replaced by Martin Winterkorn, who was head of the Audi division. At the time, the dismissal was opposed by (among others) supervisory board member Christian Wulff.

Other activities

Corporate boards
 Alfried Krupp von Bohlen und Halbach Foundation, Member of the Board of Trustees (since 2018)
 Daimler, Member of the Supervisory Board (since 2014)
 Tetra Laval, Non-Executive Member of the Board of Directors (since 1999)
 Munich Re, Chairman of the Supervisory Board (2013-2019)

Non-profit organizations
 Hilfsverein Nymphenburg, Member of the Board of Trustees
 Wittelsbacher Ausgleichsfonds (WAF), Member of the Supervisory Board
 Hertie Foundation, Member of the Board of Trustees (2001-2016)
 European Automobile Manufacturers Association (ACEA), Chairman (1998)

Controversy
In 2008, Pischetsrieder was one of several former Volkswagen managers who testified before court in a corruption case at the company involving charges of bribery, illicit sex and company-paid shopping sprees. At the time he said that he had first learned of the corrupt practices in June 2005 and subsequently dismissed the employees involved.

Personal life
Pischetsrieder is known to be an enthusiastic driver, and once wrote off a silver McLaren F1 exotic sports car; there were only 64 street legal versions of the McLaren manufactured. Sir Alec Issigonis, the British car designer and engineer who created the Morris Minor and the Mini, was a first cousin once removed of Pischetsrieder which was regarded as the reason why BMW purchased the Rover Group so Pischetsrieder could get his hands on the Mini brand.

References

1948 births
Living people
Businesspeople from Munich
Engineers from Munich
BMW people
Volkswagen Group executives
Scania AB people
Officers Crosses of the Order of Merit of the Federal Republic of Germany
Technical University of Munich alumni